The 2006 Argentine nuclear reactivation plan is a project to renew and reactivate the development of nuclear power in Argentina. The main points of the plan were announced by the Argentine government through Planning Minister Julio de Vido during a press conference on 23 August 2006. They include:
 Finishing the incomplete Atucha II Nuclear Power Plant, which was started in 1980, by 2011. , Atucha II was scheduled to start up in 2012. The plant  began to produce energy on June 27, 2014.
 Researching the feasibility of the construction of a new nuclear plant, the fourth in Argentina.
 Extending the operational life of the Embalse power plant, originally projected to end in 2011.
 Resuming the domestic production of enriched uranium.
 Working on a prototype CAREM, a low-power nuclear reactor which could also be installed in one of the TR-1700 class submarines currently under construction.

In 2010, an agreement was signed with Atomic Energy of Canada Limited (AECL) for the construction of Atucha III Nuclear Power Plant and the upgrade of Embalse  A C$440m contract was signed in August 2011 for the refurbishment of Embalse from November 2013, which will add 25–30 years to its life.

References

Science and technology in Argentina
Nuclear power in Argentina
Nuclear reactivation plan